The 2019 Bendigo Women's International was a professional tennis tournament played on outdoor hard courts. It was the thirteenth edition of the tournament which was part of the 2019 ITF Women's World Tennis Tour. It took place in Bendigo, Australia between 21 and 27 October 2019.

Singles main-draw entrants

Seeds

 1 Rankings are as of 14 October 2019.

Other entrants
The following players received wildcards into the singles main draw:
  Alison Bai
  Masa Jovanovic
  Alicia Smith
  Sara Tomic

The following player received entry as a special exempt:
  Eri Hozumi

The following players received entry from the qualifying draw:
  Haruna Arakawa
  Laura Ashley
  Jennifer Elie
  Taylah Lawless
  Amber Marshall
  Tereza Mihalíková
  Alana Parnaby
  Storm Sanders

The following player received entry as a lucky loser:
  Erina Hayashi

Champions

Singles

 Lizette Cabrera def.  Maddison Inglis, 6–2, 6–3

Doubles

 Maddison Inglis /  Kaylah McPhee def.  Naiktha Bains /  Tereza Mihalíková, 3–6, 6–2, [10–2]

References

External links
 2019 Bendigo Women's International at ITFtennis.com
 Official website

2019 ITF Women's World Tennis Tour
2019 in Australian tennis
October 2019 sports events in Australia